Aluísio da Silva Neves Júnior  (born 25 March 1979 in Conceição de Macabu), better known as  Júnior , is a Brazilian footballer who plays for Dibba Al-Hisn in United Arab Emirates. He is a defender whose game is not about strong defence.

Club career
Júnior previously played for Botafogo in the Campeonato Brasileiro Série A and Paysandu and Nacional de Patos in the Copa do Brasil. He also had a spell with Bursaspor in the Turkish Süper Lig.

References

External links
 CBF Profile
 UAE Pro League profile

Brazilian footballers
Brazilian expatriate footballers
Botafogo de Futebol e Regatas players
Paysandu Sport Club players
Nacional Atlético Clube (Patos) players
Madureira Esporte Clube players
Bursaspor footballers
FC Rapid București players
Süper Lig players
Liga I players
Expatriate footballers in Turkey
Expatriate footballers in Romania
Brazilian expatriate sportspeople in Turkey
Brazilian expatriate sportspeople in Romania
Sportspeople from Rio de Janeiro (state)
1979 births
Living people
Dibba Al-Hisn Sports Club players
Dibba FC players
Masafi Club players
UAE First Division League players
UAE Pro League players
Association football forwards